John Ford (1894–1973) was an American film director who won four Academy Awards.

John or Johnny Ford may also refer to:

Clergymen
John of Ford (c. 1140 – 1244), abbot of the Dorset Cistercian monastery Forde Abbey
John Ford (minister) (1767–1826), politician and Methodist leader in South Carolina and Mississippi Territory
John Ford (bishop) (born 1952), Bishop of Plymouth, 2005 to 2013

Public officials
John Ford (died 1407), MP for Tavistock
John Ford (fl. 1410–1426), MP for Dorset, Shaftesbury and Melcombe Regis
John Ford (before 1395–after 1416), MP for Colchester in 1416
John Salmon Ford (1815–1897), Texas politician known as "Rip" Ford
John Anson Ford (1883–1983), California politician
John Joseph Ford (1907–1982), California jurist
Sir John Ford (diplomat) (1922–2018), British diplomat
John Ford (Tennessee politician) (born 1942), American legislator
Johnny Ford (born 1942), Alabama's first African-American mayor
John Ford (New York politician) (1862–1941), New York judge and politician
John Ford (Oklahoma politician), Oklahoma politician

Literary figures
John Ford (dramatist) (1586 – ), English playwright and poet
John M. Ford (1957–2006), American science fiction writer and poet
John-James Ford (born 1972), Canadian foreign service officer, poet, short story writer, and novelist

Entrepreneurs
John Baptiste Ford (1811–1903), U.S. businessman, founder of Pittsburgh Plate Glass Company
John T. Ford (1829–1894), owner and manager of the theater where Lincoln was assassinated
John Gardner Ford (born 1951), business executive, son of U.S. President Gerald Ford

Sports
John Ford (American football coach) (before 1880 – after 1906), Marquette University football coach  
John Ford (baseball) (1894–1947), American Negro league baseball player
John Ford (cyclist) (born 1957), Bermudian Olympic cyclist
John Ford (wide receiver) (born 1966), American football player
John Ford (footballer, born 1893) (1893–1917), Scottish footballer
John Ford (footballer, born 1931), Australian rules footballer for Fitzroy
John Ford (footballer, born 1932), Australian rules footballer for North Melbourne

Others
John Ford (Royal Navy officer) (died 1796), British admiral
John D. Ford (1840–1918), American naval officer
John Ford (musician) (born 1948), English singer, songwriter and guitarist
John J. Ford Jr. (1924–2005), American numismatist
John Simpson Ford (1866–1944), Scottish industrial chemist and microbiologist
John J. Ford (CIA) (1923–1993), American CIA official and cyberneticist
John Alexander Ford, Scottish landscape artist
John M. T. Ford, English general practitioner and medical historian

See also

Jon Ford (disambiguation)
Jack Ford (disambiguation)
Ford (surname)